"Fair Trade" is a song by Canadian rapper Drake featuring vocals and production from American rapper and record producer Travis Scott. It was released on September 3, 2021, as the sixth track on Drake's sixth studio album Certified Lover Boy.

Composition 
"Fair Trade" contains samples of "Mountains", written by 	
Charlotte Day Wilson, Brandon Banks, D'Mile, Babyface, Kyle Moscovitch, Marcus Reddick, Michael Gordon, Teo Halm, and Varren Wade, as performed by the former. It features Drake and Scott singing to a banging trap beat.

Charts

Weekly charts

Year-end charts

Year-end charts

Certifications

References

2021 songs
Drake (musician) songs
Songs written by Drake (musician)
Travis Scott songs
Songs written by Travis Scott
Number-one singles in South Africa
Song recordings produced by Travis Scott
Songs written by WondaGurl
Songs written by D'Mile
Songs written by Oz (record producer)
Songs written by Babyface (musician)